The 1934–35 season was Galatasaray SK's 31st in existence and the club's 23rd consecutive season in the Istanbul Football League.

Squad statistics

Squad changes for the 1934–35 season
In:

Competitions

Istanbul Football League

Standings

Matches
Kick-off listed in local time (EEST)

İstanbul Shield

Friendly Matches

References
 Atabeyoğlu, Cem. 1453–1991 Türk Spor Tarihi Ansiklopedisi. page(127).(1991) An Grafik Basın Sanayi ve Ticaret AŞ
 Tekil, Süleyman. Dünden bugüne Galatasaray, (1983), page(66-72, 141, 160-161, 180-181). Arset Matbaacılık Kol.Şti.
 Futbol vol.2. Galatasaray. Page: 587. Tercüman Spor Ansiklopedisi. (1981)Tercüman Gazetecilik ve Matbaacılık AŞ.
 Ulus Newspaper Archive. May, August 1935.

External links
 Galatasaray Sports Club Official Website 
 Turkish Football Federation - Galatasaray A.Ş. 
 uefa.com - Galatasaray AŞ

Galatasaray S.K. (football) seasons
Turkish football clubs 1934–35 season
1930s in Istanbul